The World Group was the highest level of competition in the 2001 Fed Cup.  For this year, eight teams qualifying from the play-offs were put into two pools of four teams each, with the winner of each pool advancing to the final. The defending champions United States were meant to be an automatic qualifier for the World Group, but they withdrew due to security risks following the September 11 attacks. 

Belgium won their first title, defeating four-time finalist Russia in the final.

Participating Teams

Pools
Venue: Parque Ferial Juan Carlos I, Madrid, Spain (indoor clay)
Date: 7–10 November

Final

Russia vs. Belgium

References

See also
Fed Cup structure

 
World Group